As in a Looking Glass is a lost 1916 American silent drama film directed by Frank Hall Crane and starring famous stage star Kitty Gordon in her motion picture debut. It was produced by and distributed by the World Film Corporation.

Cast
Kitty Gordon as Lila Despard
Lumsden Hare as Andrew Livingston (credited as F. Lumsden Hare)
Frank Goldsmith as Jack Firthenbras
Gladden James as Lord Udolpho
Teddy Sampson as Felice
Charles Eldridge as Senator Gales
Eugenie Woodward as Mrs. Gales
George Majeroni as Dromiroff
Lillian Cook as Miss Vyse
Philip W. Masi as Rowell

References

External links

Kline Poster company (archived)

1916 films
American silent feature films
Lost American films
Films directed by Frank Hall Crane
World Film Company films
American black-and-white films
Silent American drama films
Lost drama films
1916 drama films
1916 lost films
1910s American films
1910s English-language films